István Brockhauser (born 3 May 1964) is a Hungarian former football player.

Hungary national football team  
From 1990 to 1992, he was the No 2 goalkeeper of the Hungarian national team behind Zsolt Petry under the Hungarian coach Kálmán Mészöly and Imre Jenei. Later on, he was replaced as No2 goalkeeper by Zoltán Végh.

KRC Genk  
Brockhauser reached his biggest success while playing for Belgian club KRC Genk. He was a member of the very successful team that featured Branko Strupar, Souleymane Oularé, Thordur Ghudjonsson, Mike Origi, Domenico Olivieri, Wilfried Delbroek and others.

In his six years with KRC Genk, Brockhauser grew to be one of the most popular players in the club's history. He was infamous for firing up the Genk fans when he walked to his goal, waving his arms and cheering to the fans while the crowd chanted 'Brockie! Brockie! Brockie!'. 'Brockie', as he was called by the fans, became one of the club's icons and a living legend for the Genk fans.

In the 2001 season he broke his leg after a harsh tackle from Korean SK Beveren striker Lee Sang Il, after which the entire stadium yelled and boo-ed the striker and the other Genk players looked for the Korean to take revenge. Brockhauser recovered in two months, but lost his place to Jan Moons with whom Brockhauser had been challenging to be first choice keeper in Genk.

The 2002 season, when Genk became Belgian champions for the second time, was Brockhauser's last season at KRC Genk. He completed the season as second keeper behind Jan Moons, only gaining some minor time on the pitch with a heroic goodbye from Genk fans at the end of that season's final game, against SK Lokeren.

Honours  
Hungarian League:  1990, 1993 
Hungarian Cup: 1992, 1996
Belgian First Division: 1998–99, 2001–02
Belgian Cup: 1997–98, 1999–2000

See also 
 Jupiler League

External links 
 
 
 Voetbal International. 2003.
 
 Kutschera Ambrosius, 2005
 Yoon Hyung-Jin, 2003
 Janofsky Michael. 1990. Hungary Dominates United States, 2–0. New York Times

1964 births
Living people
Footballers from Budapest
Hungarian footballers
Association football goalkeepers
Hungary international footballers
Vác FC players
Újpest FC players
Budapest Honvéd FC players
Győri ETO FC players
Hungarian expatriate footballers
Expatriate footballers in Belgium
K.R.C. Genk players
Hungarian expatriate sportspeople in Belgium